Alahor in Granata is an opera in two acts by Gaetano Donizetti to an anonymous Italian libretto (indicated only with the initials "M.A.") after Jean-Pierre Claris de Florian's text Gonzalve de Cordoue, ou Granade reconquise (1793). However, it seems that the original basis of the libretto goes back to one by Felice Romani written for Meyerbeer in 1821, which in turn can be traced back through another iteration to begin with the de Florian version.

Performance history
The score was eventually lost, but a copy – "not in the composer's hand" – was subsequently discovered in Boston in 1970. Finally, the autograph score came to light a few years later in Palermo. Some of the music was recycled into Emilia di Liverpool in 1828 and L'Elisir d'amore in 1832.

The first contemporary production, in Seville in 1998, has been preserved on DVD.

Roles

Synopsis 
Time: The middle ages
Place: Granada

Recordings

References
Notes

Cited sources
Osborne, Charles, (1994), The Bel Canto Operas of Rossini, Donizetti, and Bellini, Portland, Oregon: Amadeus Press. 

Other sources
Allitt, John Stewart (1991), Donizetti: in the light of Romanticism and the teaching of Johann Simon Mayr, Shaftesbury: Element Books, Ltd (UK); Rockport, MA: Element, Inc.(USA)
Ashbrook, William (1982), Donizetti and His Operas, Cambridge University Press. 
Ashbrook, William (1998), "Donizetti, Gaetano" in Stanley Sadie (Ed.), The New Grove Dictionary of Opera, Vol. One. London: Macmillan Publishers, Inc.  
Ashbrook, William and Sarah Hibberd (2001), in Holden, Amanda (Ed.), The New Penguin Opera Guide, New York: Penguin Putnam. . pp. 224–247.
Loewenberg, Alfred (1970). Annals of Opera, 1597–1940, 2nd edition. Rowman and Littlefield
Sadie, Stanley, (Ed.); John Tyrell (Exec. Ed.) (2004), The New Grove Dictionary of Music and Musicians. 2nd edition. London: Macmillan.  (hardcover).   (eBook).
 Weinstock, Herbert (1963), Donizetti and the World of Opera in Italy, Paris, and Vienna in the First Half of the Nineteenth Century, New York: Pantheon Books.

External links
 Donizetti Society (London) website

Italian-language operas
Operas by Gaetano Donizetti
1826 operas
Operas
Operas set in Spain